The Salina Stockade is a professional baseball team based in Salina, Kansas that began play in 2016. From 2017-2019 it was a traveling team which competed in various leagues when a league has an uneven number of teams.

History 
Formed in 2016, the Salina Stockade were originally part of the Pecos League. 

In 2017 Salina Stockade joined the American Association of Independent Professional Baseball, which is not affiliated with Major or Minor League Baseball, to replace the Laredo Lemurs, which folded. 

The Stockade played the 2017 season as a road franchise, with only sixteen home games at Dean Evans Stadium.

The team played a similar schedule in 2018, traveling to play each of the six teams in the Can-Am League.

In 2019, the Stockade joined The Western League a four-week winter organization, as a charter team. On March 31, 2019 it was announced that they would traveling to play each of the teams in the Pacific Association.

In 2020, the Stockade returned as a member of the Western League, and played games out of Bakersfield, California. It was later announced they'd be activated for the 2020 Pecos League season; the Stockade competed as one of four teams in the Mountain Division for the condensed 60-game season (due to the COVID-19 pandemic). All games were played at Coastal Baseball Park in Houston, Texas. The Stockade lost in the Championship series to the Tucson Saguaros 2 games to 0.

The Pecos League announced in February 2021 that the Stockade would return as a full member following improvements to Dean Evans Stadium, which included installation of artificial turf. However, the franchise did not play any home games in Salina during the 2021 season, instead hosting seven home games at El Dorado's McDonald Stadium and six in Colby. 

Following the season, the team was dropped from the Pecos League lineup. The club will only compete in the Pecos Spring League (formerly known as the Western League) during the 2022 season, which will be hosted at Coastal Baseball Park in Houston.

Season-by-season record

References

External links
Salina Stockade website

Pecos League teams
American Association of Professional Baseball teams
Professional baseball teams in Kansas
2016 establishments in Kansas
Baseball teams established in 2016
Sports in Salina, Kansas